Sertel is Turkish surname. People with the surname include:

Atilla Sertel (born 1956), Turkish politician and journalist
Cemali Sertel (born 2000), Turkish football player
Sabiha Sertel (1895–1968), Turkish journalist
Zekeriya Sertel (1890–1980), Turkish journalist

Turkish-language surnames
Turkish words and phrases